Jerzy Rzedowski Rotter (born December 27, 1926) is a Mexican botanist. His focus is on Mexican floristics, taxonomy, and ecology.

Education and personal life
He was born in Lwów, Poland (now in Ukraine) to Arnold and Ernestyna (nee Rotter) Rzedowski. When he was young the family was imprisoned in a concentration camp until World War II ended, when he and his father were liberated by the Allies. They then travelled to Mexico in 1946 for a new life.

He studied for a bachelor's degree in Biology at the Instituto Politecnico Nacional, starting in 1949, and a PhD in Botany at Universidad Nacional Autónoma de México awarded in 1961. His bachelor's thesis, on the Flora of the Pedregal de San Angel, (Vegetación del Pedregal de San Angel, Distrito Federal, Mexico) and doctoral thesis (Vegetación del Estado de San Luis Potosi) led to his scientific research career.

In 1954 Rzedowski married Graciela Calderón Díaz-Barriga.

Career
He worked at Syntex in 1953. From 1954 to 1959 he was appointed as a professor at Universidad Autónoma de San Luis Potosí and director of that University's Instituto de Investigación de Zonas Desérticas. In 1959 he moved to the Colegio de Postgraduados de Chapingo, Mexico as professor-investigator and then in 1961 was appointed as professor at the Escuela Nacional de Ciencias Biológicas del Instituto Politecnico Nacional, where he remained until 1984. He then founded the Centro Regional del Bajío, Instituto de Ecología, Pátzcuaro, Michoacán.

At the time he started to work on Mexican floristics, very few studies were published in that field, so he became a pioneer in it. His research has involved extensive fieldwork. Afterwards, he became the most respected botanist in Mexico. He explored a lot of places surveying the local plant life and collected more than 50,000 specimens that can be found in many herbaria. He has also contributed significantly to the taxonomy of Burseraceae and Compositae.

Rzedowski has also provided leadership to the botanical community in Mexico and internationally. He was significant in the re-development of the Sociedad Botanica de Mexico and he organized the First Mexican Botanical Congress in 1960. In 1988 he launched the scientific journal Acta Botánica Mexicana.

Publications

Rzedowski is the author of Vegetación de México (1971) and the co-editor and co-author of Flora Fanerogámica del Valle de México (1979; 2001, 2nd edition), and of Flora del Bajío y de Regiones Adyacentes (1991–).

Honors
In 1995, he was awarded the Asa Gray Award. In 1999 he was one of the botanists on whom was conferred the Millennium Botany Award. In 2005 he, jointly with Graciela Calderón de Rzedowski, was awarded the José Cuatrecasas Medal for Excellence in Tropical Botany. 

The herbaria of Instituto Politécnico Nacional and of Universidad Autónoma de Querétaro are named after Rzedowski, as is also the botanical garden of Universidad Autónoma Agraria Antonio Narro.

The following taxa have been named after him:

Agave rzedowskiana
Anthurium rzedowskii
Bernardia rzedowskii
Bouvardia rzedowskii
Bursera rzedowskii
Canthon rzedowskii
Cercocarpus rzedowskii
Commelina rzedowskii
Crotalaria rzedowskii
Croton rzedowskii
Dalea rzedowskii
Dioon rzedowskii
Eleocharis rzedowskii
Euphorbia rzedowskii
Galium rzedowskii
Habenaria rzedowskiana
Jatropha rzedowskii
Magnolia rzedowskiana
Pachyphytum rzedowskii
Pinus rzedowskii
Psilocybe rzedowskii
Rondeletia rzedowskii
Rzedowskia tolantonguensis 
Schoenocaulon rzedowskii
Sedum jerzedowskii

References

Living people
Mexican botanists
1926 births
Nazi concentration camp survivors
National Autonomous University of Mexico alumni
Instituto Politécnico Nacional alumni
Scientists from Lviv
Polish emigrants to Mexico